Dmytro Ivanovych Kapinus (born 28 April 2003) is a Ukrainian professional footballer who plays as a right-back for Metalist 1925 Kharkiv on loan from Shakhtar Donetsk.

Career

Early years
Born in Cherkasy, Kapinus began his career in the local Dnipro-80 from the age 6 and then continued in the Metalist Kharkiv and the Shakhtar Donetsk youth sportive school systems. He played in the Ukrainian Premier League Reserves and never made his debut for the senior Shakhtar Donetsk squad.

Metalist 1925 Kharkiv
In January 2022, he signed a on loan deal with the Ukrainian Premier League side Metalist 1925 Kharkiv and made his debut in the Ukrainian Premier League as a second half-time substuituted player in a home match against Chornomorets Odesa on 27 August 2022.

References

External links
 
 

2003 births
Living people
Sportspeople from Cherkasy
Ukrainian footballers
Ukraine youth international footballers
Ukraine under-21 international footballers
Association football defenders
FC Shakhtar Donetsk players
FC Metalist 1925 Kharkiv players
Ukrainian Premier League players
21st-century Ukrainian people